is a railway station on the Sanin Main Line of West Japan Railway Company (JR West) located in Matsue, Shimane Prefecture, Japan.

The station started operation on November 8, 1908.

Adjacent stations
West Japan Railway Company (JR West)

References

External links 
  Matsue Station (JR West)

Stations of West Japan Railway Company
Railway stations in Japan opened in 1908
Railway stations in Shimane Prefecture
Sanin Main Line